The Apostolic Vicariate of Ingwavuma is a Roman Catholic apostolic Vicariate located in Ingwavuma (Umkhanyakude District Municipality) in South Africa.

History
 12 November 1962: Established as Apostolic Prefecture of Ingwavuma from the Diocese of Eshowe and Diocese of Manzini
 19 November 1990: Promoted as Apostolic Vicariate of Ingwavuma

Leadership
 Prefects Apostolic of Ingwavuma 
 Fr. Edwin Roy Kinch, O.S.M. (13 November 1962 – 9 May 1970)
 Fr. Anselm Donald Mary Dennehy, O.S.M. (Apostolic Administrator 8 May 1970 – 1976)
 Fr. Michael Mary O'Shea, O.S.M. (9 January 1976 – 19 November 1990)
 Vicars Apostolic of Ingwavuma 
 Bishop Michael Mary O'Shea, O.S.M. (19 November 1990 – 30 May 2006)
 Bishop José Luís Gerardo Ponce de León, I.M.C. (24 November 2008 – 29 November 2013), appointed Bishop of Manzini
 Bishop Mandla Siegfried Jwara, C.M.M. (30 April 2016 - 9 June 2021)
 Fr. Vusumuzi Francis Mazibuko, O.M.I (20 March 2023 – present)

References

External links
 GCatholic.org
 Catholic Hierarchy 

Roman Catholic dioceses in South Africa
Christian organizations established in 1962
Apostolic vicariates
Roman Catholic dioceses and prelatures established in the 20th century
Umkhanyakude District Municipality